Nadezhda Dubovitskaya (born 12 March 1998) is a Kazakhstani athlete specializing in high jump. She won a bronze medal at the 2018 Asian Games. She has been the Asian record holder in women's high jump since June 8, 2021.

Her personal best is 2.00m outdoors (Almaty 2021), which set a new Asian record, 1 centimeter higher than the previous one made by her compatriot Marina Aitova in 2009. Her personal best indoors is 1.98m (Belgrade 2022).

International competitions

References

1998 births
Living people
Kazakhstani female high jumpers
Athletes (track and field) at the 2018 Asian Games
Asian Games bronze medalists for Kazakhstan
Asian Games medalists in athletics (track and field)
Medalists at the 2018 Asian Games
Competitors at the 2019 Summer Universiade
Athletes (track and field) at the 2020 Summer Olympics
Olympic athletes of Kazakhstan
World Athletics Indoor Championships medalists
20th-century Kazakhstani women
21st-century Kazakhstani women